Nevill Josiah Aylmer Coghill VC (25 January 1852 – 22 January 1879) was an Irish recipient of the Victoria Cross, the highest and most prestigious award for gallantry in the face of the enemy that can be awarded to British and Commonwealth forces.

Family and early life
Born in Drumcondra, Dublin, Coghill was the eldest son of Sir John Joscelyn Coghill (1826–1905), 4th Baronet, JP, DL, of Drumcondra, County Dublin (see Coghill baronets), and his wife, the Hon. Katherine Frances Plunket, daughter of John Plunket, 3rd Baron Plunket. He was a nephew of David Plunket, 1st Baron Rathmore and William Plunket, 4th Baron Plunket. The painter Sir Egerton Coghill, 5th Baronet (who had a son also called Nevill named in his honour) was his younger brother.

Coghill was educated at Haileybury College from 1865 to 1869. In 1876 he set sail with the 24th Regiment of Foot to Cape.

Battle of Isandlwana

Coghill was twenty-six years old and a lieutenant in the 1st Battalion, 24th Regiment of Foot (later The South Wales Borderers), British Army, during the Zulu War, when the following deed took place for which he was awarded the VC. He was an orderly officer to Colonel R. T. Glyn, who regarded him as his favourite officer and the son he never had.

On 22 January 1879, after the disaster of the Battle of Isandhlwana, South Africa, Lieutenant Coghill joined Lieutenant Teignmouth Melvill who was trying to save the Queen's Colour of the Regiment. They were pursued by Zulu warriors, and while crossing the swollen River Buffalo, Lieutenant Coghill (despite his injured knee) went to the rescue of his brother officer, who had lost his horse and was in great danger. Although Coghill's horse was shot by a Zulu warrior, the valiant soldier swam on to rescue Melvill. After some time, the Colour was swept from their grasp and floated down the bank. After reaching the bank, the two men were eventually overtaken by the Zulu warriors and, following a short struggle, both were killed. Lieutenant Walter Higginson, who was persuaded to escape, heard and witnessed their final actions when they fought to the last. The Colour was retrieved from the river ten days later by a mounted party under Major Wilsone Black.

Legacy and award of Victoria Cross

Two weeks after the battle, Coghill and Melvill's bodies were found by a search party and both buried at Fugitive's Drift. Major-General Dillon informed Coghill's father in a letter, that had it not been for the valour of his son, the Colour would have fallen to Zulu hands. Coghill's father donated his son's trophies including a Zulu shield to the Museum of Science and Art, now the National Museum of Ireland. Coghill and Melvill were amongst the first soldiers to receive the VC posthumously in 1907. Initially The London Gazette mentioned that had they survived they would have been awarded the VC. 

A few months after the Battle of Isandlwana, a French battle artist, Alphonse de Neuville painted Coghill and Melvill's actions when they were pursued by Zulu warriors.

The attempted escape of Melvill and Nevill Coghill was depicted in the 1918 silent film Symbol of Sacrifice. 
Coghill was portrayed by Christopher Cazenove in the 1979 film Zulu Dawn as a polite and humorous officer. In the film, he is friends with Melvill; their heroic actions when they crossed the Buffalo River in a desperate attempt to return the Queen's Colour back to Natal was depicted in the film.

Coghill's great-great-great grand-niece, Jane Mann, in 2014, passed a painting (of her ancestor and Melvill pursued by Zulus) by contemporary military artist Jason Askew to the Victoria Cross Museum.

The Colour which Coghill and Melvill tried to save was recovered and is on display at Brecon Cathedral in remembrance of their valour as well as other soldiers killed during the battle. Coghill's Victoria Cross is permanently displayed at the Regimental Museum of The Royal Welsh in Brecon, Powys, Wales. At Haileybury College, a leadership programme for pupils in Removes is named in his honour.

References

External links

 
 National Army Museum Posthumous VCs: Lieutenant Nevill Coghill
 A painting of Nevill Coghill
 Memorial to Nevill Coghill on Fugitive's Drift, below Itchiane Hill

1852 births
1879 deaths
19th-century Irish people
Irish officers in the British Army
Irish recipients of the Victoria Cross
People from Drumcondra, Dublin
South Wales Borderers officers
Anglo-Zulu War recipients of the Victoria Cross
Heirs apparent who never acceded
British military personnel killed in the Anglo-Zulu War
British Army personnel of the Anglo-Zulu War
British Army recipients of the Victoria Cross
People educated at Haileybury and Imperial Service College